The Statute Law Revision Act 1883 (46 & 47 Vict c 39) is an Act of the Parliament of the United Kingdom.

This Act was partly in force in Great Britain at the end of 2010.

The enactments which were repealed (whether for the whole or any part of the United Kingdom) by this Act were repealed so far as they extended to the Isle of Man on 25 July 1991.

This Act was retained for the Republic of Ireland by section 2(2)(a) of, and Part 4 of Schedule 1 to, the Statute Law Revision Act 2007.

The Preamble, and the Schedule, to this Act were repealed by section 1 of, and Part I of the Schedule to, the Statute Law Revision Act 1898 (61 & 62 Vict c 22).

See also
Statute Law Revision Act

References
The Public General Statutes passed in the forty-sixth and forty-seventh years of the reign of Her Majesty Queen Victoria, 1883. Queen's Printer. East Harding Street, London. 1883. Pages 130 to 174.

External links
List of amendments and repeals in the Republic of Ireland from the Irish Statute Book.

United Kingdom Acts of Parliament 1883